Russell James Maryland (born March 22, 1969) is a former professional American football player. He played defensive tackle for ten seasons for the Dallas Cowboys, Oakland Raiders, and Green Bay Packers of the National Football League (NFL). He was drafted by the Cowboys first overall in the 1991 NFL Draft. He played college football for the University of Miami Hurricanes.

Early years
Maryland was born and raised in Chicago, Illinois, where he played high school football at Whitney M. Young Magnet High School. He was not highly recruited, and the only major college program to offer him a scholarship was the University of Miami.

In 1989, he was named third team All-American. As a senior in 1990, he registered 96 tackles and  quarterback sacks for the Miami Hurricanes. He was named All-American, College Football Lineman of the Year by the UPI and became the first Hurricane player ever to receive the Outland Trophy for the best lineman in college.

Maryland finished his college career with 279 tackles, 25 tackles for losses and 20.5 quarterback sacks, while helping his team win two national championships, four bowl games, a perfect home record and a 44-4 overall record.

Prior to his graduation from Miami, Russell was inducted into the Iron Arrow Honor Society, the highest honor bestowed by the university.

In 2001 he was inducted into the University of Miami Sports Hall of Fame. In 2001, he was inducted into the Cotton Bowl Hall of Fame. In 2011, he was inducted into the College Football Hall of Fame. In 2016, he received the NCAA Silver Anniversary Award.

Professional career

Dallas Cowboys
Maryland was the first overall pick in the 1991 NFL Draft, by the Dallas Cowboys, after the initial No. 1 prospect Raghib Ismail decided to sign with the Toronto Argonauts.  After the New England Patriots failed to sign Ismail, the Cowboys attempted to do so by trading for the first overall pick, sending the Patriots Eugene Lockhart, Ron Francis, David Howard, a 1991 first round pick (#11 Pat Harlow) and a 1991 second round pick (#41 Jerome Henderson).

Maryland started as a rookie defensive tackle and from the beginning showed the relentless motor and effort that he would be known for. He was especially stout against the run and helped the team win three Super Bowls. In 1993 he was named to his only Pro Bowl.

Oakland Raiders
On July 19, 1996, he signed as a free agent with the Oakland Raiders. On April 1, 2000, he was released in a salary cap move. He started 63 out of 64 games with the Raiders.

Green Bay Packers
On April 20, 2000, he was signed as a free agent by the Green Bay Packers, to replace Gilbert Brown as the team's starting nose tackle. He started all 16 games during the season. On September 2, 2001, he was released after refusing to take a pay cut.

During his 10-year career he started 140-of-154 games, had 375 tackles, 24.5 sacks and forced nine fumbles.

NFL statistics

References

External links
 
University of Miami Sports Hall of Fame bio

1969 births
Living people
Players of American football from Chicago
American football defensive tackles
Whitney M. Young Magnet High School alumni
Miami Hurricanes football players
All-American college football players
College Football Hall of Fame inductees
National Football League first-overall draft picks
Dallas Cowboys players
Oakland Raiders players
Green Bay Packers players
National Conference Pro Bowl players